Anastasia Bolkvadze (born 6 November 2002) is a Georgian footballer, who plays as a forward for Altay in the Turkish Women's Football Super League, and the Georgia women's national team.

Club career
Bolkvadze transferred to Altay S.K. in İzmir, Turkey to play in the Turkcell Super League.

International career
Bolkvadze capped for Georgia at senior level during the UEFA Women's Euro 2022 qualifying.

International goals

References

2002 births
Living people
Women's footballers from Georgia (country)
Women's association football forwards
Georgia (country) women's international footballers
Expatriate women's footballers from Georgia (country)
Expatriate women's footballers in Turkey
Altay S.K. (women's football) players
Expatriate sportspeople from Georgia (country) in Turkey